Tip TV is an Albanian television channel for children and teenagers aged 6 to 17. It was launched on 10 October 2011 at 04:00 pm by the TV platform Tring. The channel's content is either dubbed or subtitled in Albanian.

Programming

Original Productions
 Artist Tak Fak
 Hip Hop Show
 I Love Music
 Superhero Quiz
 Tring Art Club

Animated series
 Heroic Age (Starways)
 Huntik: Secrets & Seekers (Huntik)
 Kung Fu Dino Posse (Kung Fu Dino)
 Monster Allergy (Alergji nga përbindëshat)
 The Invisible Man (Njeriu i padukshëm)
 What's with Andy? (Ç'po shpik Andi?)

Live-Action TV Series
 Aliens in America (Nxënësi i ri)
 Big Time Rush (Ëndrra e suksesit)
 Blue Water High (Shkolla e notit)
 Dino Dan (Dino Den)
 Game Shakers (Superloja)
 H2O: Just Add Water (H2O)
 House of Anubis (Shtëpia e sekreteve)
 K.C. Undercover (Kej-Si në një mision të fshehtë)
 Liv and Maddie (Binjaket)
 Maggie & Bianca: Fashion Friends (Megi dhe Bianca)
 Mako: Island of Secrets (Mako: Ishulli i sirenave)
 Merlin (Sekreti magjik)
 Mortified (Pse mua?)
 Sam & Cat (Semi dhe Keti)
 Sonny with a Chance (Soni mes yjesh)
 The Adventures of Shirley Holmes (Aventurat e Shirley Holmes)
 The Sarah Jane Adventures (Aventurat e Sarës)
 Think Big
 Victorious (Hollywood Arts)
 Wingin' It (Engjëll në kampus)

Animated Movies
 A Matter of Loaf and Death (Uollas dhe Gromit në një çështje për jetë a vdekje)
 A Monster in Paris (Një përbindësh në Paris)
 Appleseed Alpha (Appleseed Alpha: Në kërkim të qytetit Olimp)
 Brave (Ariu dhe harku)
 Cloudy with a Chance of Meatballs (Rrebesh qoftesh)
 Coraline (Koralina dhe porta magjike)
 Despicable Me (Gru dhe minionët)
 Despicable Me 2 (Gru dhe minionët 2)
 Dragon Hunters (Gjuetarët e dragonjve)
 Epic (Leafmen)
 Fantastic Mr. Fox (Aventurat e qytetarit Fox)
 Frozen (Një aventurë e akullt)
 Gnomeo & Juliet (Qeramikat)
 Horton Hears a Who! (Hortoni dëgjon diçka)
 Igor (Igori)
 Minions (Minionët)
 Moana (Vaiana: Ishulli legjendar)
 Monsters University (Monsters & Co 2)
 Penguins of Madagascar (Pinguinët e Madagaskarit)
 Planes (Fluturimi i heroit)
 Puss in Boots (Maçoku me çizme)
 Ratatouille (Ratatuja)
 Shrek
 Sing (Të gjithë në skenë)
 Tangled (Flokëarta)
 The Book of Life (Legjenda e Manolos)
 The Boss Baby (Shefi i vogël)
 The Pirate Fairy
 The Road to El Dorado (Rruga për në El Dorado)
 Toy Story 3 (Bota e lodrave 3)
 WALL-E (Uoll-E)
 Wreck-It Ralph (Ralf shkatërruesi)
 Zootopia (Qyteti i kafshëve)

Live-Action Movies
 A Wrinkle in Time (Një udhëtim përmes universit)
 Agent Cody Banks (Adolegjenti)
 Akeelah and the Bee (Një fjalë për një ëndërr)
 Alexander and the Terrible, Horrible, No Good, Very Bad Day (Një ditë fantastike për të mos u harruar)
 Alice Through the Looking Glass (Liza përtej pasqyrës)
 Alvin and the Chipmunks (Alvin superstari)
 Alvin and the Chipmunks: The Squeakquel (Alvin superstari 2)
 Alvin and the Chipmunks: Chipwrecked (Alvin superstari 3)
 An American Girl: Saige Paints the Sky (Qielli i Seixhit)
 Annabelle Hooper and the Ghosts of Nantucket (Anabel Huper dhe fantazma e Nentakit)
 Another Cinderella Story (Një tjetër histori Hirusheje)
 Aquamarine (Shoqja ime sirenë)
 Beauty and the Beast (E bukura dhe bisha)
 Beethoven (Bethoven: Një më shumë në familje)
 Bratz (Bratz: Filmi)
 Bridge to Terabithia (Ura për në Terabithia)
 Bring It On (Lart e më lart)
 Camp Rock
 Camp Rock 2: The Final Jam
 Cheaper by the Dozen
 Cheaper by the Dozen 2 (Duzina ime e çmendur 2)
 City of Ember (Qyteti i Emberit)
 Daddy Day Camp (Kampingu i baballarëve)
 Daddy Day Care (Kopshti i baballarëve)
 Descendants (Pasardhësit)
 Diary of a Wimpy Kid (Ditari i një dështaku)
 Diary of a Wimpy Kid 2: Rodrick Rules (Ditari i një dështaku 2)
 Diary of a Wimpy Kid: Dog Days (Ditari i një dështaku 3)
 Diary of a Wimpy Kid: The Long Haul (Ditari i një dështaku 3)
 Dolphin Tale (Pacienti Winter)
 Dolphin Tale 2 (Pacienti Winter 2)
 Dr. Dolittle (Doktori i kafshëve)
 Dr. Dolittle 2 (Doktori i kafshëve 2)
 Dr. Dolittle 3 (Doktori i kafshëve 3)
 Ella Enchanted (Bota magjike e Elës)
 Enchanted (Kënaqësia)
 Flubber (Ëndrrat prej gome)
 Freaky Friday (E premtja e çmendur)
 Hannah Montana: Best of Both Worlds Concert (Hana Montana: Koncerti)
 Hannah Montana: The Movie (Hana Montana: Filmi)
 Harry Potter and the Philosopher's Stone
 Harry Potter and the Chamber of Secrets
 Harry Potter and the Prisoner of Azkaban
 Harry Potter and the Goblet of Fire
 High School Musical (Koncerti i gjimnazit)
 High School Musical 2 (Koncerti i gjimnazit 2)
 High School Musical 3: Senior Year (Koncerti i gjimnazit 3)
 Horrid Henry: The Movie (Henri i tmerrshëm)
 Invisible Sister (Motra ime e padukshme)
 Jessica Darling's IT List (Lista shkollore e Jesika Darling)
 Journey to the Center of the Earth (Udhëtim në qendër të Tokës)
 Jumanji (Loja e xhunglës)
 Little Manhattan (Në Manhatan)
 Maleficent (Bukuroshja e fjetur)
 Material Girls (Vajzat materialiste)
 Mr. Popper's Penguins
 Nanny McPhee (Neni Mek Fi)
 Nanny McPhee and the Big Bang
 Nim's Island
 Pan
 Percy Jackson & the Olympians: The Lightning Thief (Hajduti i rrufeve)
 Percy Jackson: Sea of Monsters (Deti i përbindëshave)
 Princess Protection Program (Programi i mbrojtjes së princeshave)
 RV (Një kamping i pazakontë)
 She's the Man (Ajo është ai)
 Spy Kids (Agjentët e vegjël)
 Spy Kids 2: The Island of Lost Dreams (Agjentët e vegjël 2)
 Spy Kids 3-D: Game Over (Agjentët e vegjël 3)
 Spy Kids: All the Time in the World (Agjentët e vegjël dhe tregtari i lodrave)
 Stormbreaker (Rekruti)
 Teenage Mutant Ninja Turtles (Breshkat ninxha)
 Teenage Mutant Ninja Turtles II: The Secret of the Ooze (Breshkat ninxha 2)
 Teenage Mutant Ninja Turtles III (Breshkat ninxha 3)
 The BFG
 The Chronicles of Narnia: The Lion, the Witch and the Wardrobe (Kronikat e Narnias: Luani, shtriga dhe garderoba)
 The Chronicles of Narnia: Prince Caspian (Kronikat e Narnias: Princi Kaspian)
 The Chronicles of Narnia: The Voyage of the Dawn Treader
 The Karate Kid (Djali i karatesë)
 The Last Song (Kënga e fundit)
 The Little Rascals (Mistrecat e vegjël)
 The Parent Trap (Prindër në kurth)
 The Princess Diaries (Ditari i princeshës)
 The Princess Diaries 2: Royal Engagement (Ditari i princeshës 2: Fejesa mbretërore)
 The Velveteen Rabbit
 Who Framed Roger Rabbit
 Wizards of Waverly Place: The Movie'' (Magjistarët e sheshit Uejverli)

See also
 Television in Albania
 Vizion Plus
 Tring
 Tring Sport

References

External links
Official Website
Channel and transponder list

Television networks in Albania
Tring television networks
Television channels and stations established in 2011
Mass media in Tirana